Matthew Lytle (born September 4, 1975) is a former American football quarterback of the National Football League. He was signed by the Seattle Seahawks as a street free agent in 2000. He played college football at Pittsburgh.

Lytle was also a member of the Carolina Panthers, Baltimore Ravens and Colorado Crush.

Professional career

Rhein Fire
In the 2000 offseason, Lytle played for the Rhein Fire of NFL Europe and won World Bowl VIII.

Seattle Seahawks
Lytle was claimed off waivers by the Seattle Seahawks on August 28, 2000. He made his NFL debut on October 22 in a 31–3 loss to the Oakland Raiders, but did not record any statistics. He also appeared in the team's 17–15 win over the San Diego Chargers on November 5.

Lytle was later waived and re-signed to the practice squad on November 23.

Carolina Panthers
On December 4, 2000, Lytle was signed off the practice squad to the Carolina Panthers' active roster after defensive end Jason Peter was placed on injured reserve. He was inactive for every game the rest of the season.

Lytle made his 2001 preseason debut for the Panthers on August 18 in a 23–8 loss to the New England Patriots. He attempted just one pass in the game, failing to connect with receiver Jim Turner. Lytle saw more extensive action in the preseason finale against the Cleveland Browns on August 31. After a 90-yard kickoff returned for a touchdown by Browns receiver Andre King with five minutes remaining in the game, Lytle led the two-play, 59-yard drive which culminated with a 51-yard touchdown to receiver Dialleo Burks. Lytle finished the game 5-for-8 for 114 yards and a touchdown, while also carrying the ball twice for a total of five yards, as the Panthers beat the Browns 23–20.

Lytle began the 2001 season as the Panthers' third-string quarterback behind starter Chris Weinke and backup Dameyune Craig. He made his regular season Panthers debut on November 4 against the Miami Dolphins after Weinke went down with a shoulder injury and Craig with a foot injury. Lytle played the final six minutes of the game against the Dolphins, going 2-for-4 for seven yards and losing 13 yards on two sacks as the Panthers lost 23–6.

The following week against the St. Louis Rams, Lytle made his first and only NFL start. He completed 15 of 25 passes for 126 yards and a touchdown while rushing for eight yards on two carries. However, he was also intercepted by Rams defensive backs Kim Herring and Aeneas Williams. His first career touchdown pass came on a four-yard grab by tight end Kris Mangum, but the Panthers fell to the Rams 48–14.

Lytle's final Panthers appearance came the following month in a 27–23 loss to the New Orleans Saints. Lytle threw just one pass in the game after Weinke went down with a concussion, and was intercepted by cornerback Fred Thomas.

The following offseason, Lytle was tendered a contract offer by the Panthers as an exclusive-rights free agent. However, the team rescinded the offer on May 21, 2002, making him an unrestricted free agent.

Montreal Alouettes
Lytle played with the Montreal Alouettes of the CFL in 2002. He was the backup to longtime CFL star Anthony Calvillo with the Als. Lytle played seven games (with one start), and went 11/27 passing for 182 yards, throwing one touchdown and one interception.

Baltimore Ravens
After spending the 2002 season in the CFL, Lytle was signed by the Baltimore Ravens on July 23, 2003. He failed to make the team out of training camp, however, and was released on August 25.

Colorado Crush
On November 23, 2003, Lytle signed with the Colorado Crush of the Arena Football League. However, he failed to earn a job with the team on opening day and was released in favor of Jose Davis and John Dutton on February 2, 2004.

References

1975 births
Living people
Sportspeople from Lancaster, Pennsylvania
American football quarterbacks
Canadian football quarterbacks
American players of Canadian football
Players of American football from Pennsylvania
Pittsburgh Panthers football players
Rhein Fire players
Seattle Seahawks players
Carolina Panthers players
Montreal Alouettes players
Baltimore Ravens players
Colorado Crush players
People from Wyomissing, Pennsylvania